Antonia was a daughter of Marcus Antonius the orator, who was the proconsul for the Roman province of Cilicia. She was abducted in Italy, during a visit to Misenum (modern Miseno), by the Cilician pirates with whom her father had so often clashed. Her freedom was obtained only on payment of a large ransom.

See also
List of kidnappings
List of solved missing persons cases

References

1st-century BC Romans
1st-century BC Roman women
2nd-century BC Roman women
Antonii
Formerly missing people
Kidnapped children
Kidnappings in Italy
Missing person cases in Italy
People captured by pirates
Roman victims of crime